Ben Jarvis (born 27 July 2000) is a former Australian rules footballer who played for Geelong in the Australian Football League (AFL). He was recruited by Geelong with the 48th pick in the 2018 AFL draft.

AFL career 
Jarvis made his debut in Geelong's 26 point loss to the Richmond in the 17th round of the 2020 AFL season. He was delisted by Geelong at the conclusion of the 2021 season.

Statistics
 Statistics are correct to the end of the 2020 season

|-
! scope="row" style="text-align:center" | 2020
|
| 10 || 1 || 0 || 1 || 3 || 2 || 5 || 3 || 1 || 0.0 || 1.0 || 3.0 || 2.0 || 5.0 || 3.0 || 1.0
|- class="sortbottom"
! colspan=3| Career
! 1
! 0
! 1
! 3
! 2
! 5
! 3
! 1
! 0.0
! 1.0
! 3.0
! 2.0
! 5.0
! 3.0
! 1.0
|}

Notes

References

External links

2000 births
Living people
Geelong Football Club players
Australian rules footballers from South Australia